The French submarine Amazone was an Armide-class diesel-electric attack submarine built for the Greek Navy before and during World War I. It was built in the Schneider-Creusot shipyards between 1913 and 1916, but was seized during the war by the French Government before it could be sold, on 3 June 1915. Amazone operated in the Adriatic Sea during the course of World War I and was stricken from the Navy list in July 1932.

Design
Propulsion while surfaced was provided by two  diesel motors built by Schneider-Carels and two  electric motors.

The submarine was armed with four  torpedo tubes and a  L/34 M1897 deck gun. The crew consisted of 31 officers and seamen.

Construction and service 

Amazone was ordered by the Greek Navy in 1913, based on a design by Maxime Laubeuf. The ship, which was initially designated X, was confiscated by the French Government on 30 May 1917 during World War I.

Amazone was built in the Schneider shipyard in Chalon-sur-Saone. It was laid down in 1913, launched in August 1916, and completed in June 1917. It was named after the mythological creatures, the Amazons.

After its launching, Amazone served on the Adriatic Sea until 1918, when it was assigned to the 3rd Submarine Flotilla, based in Moudros, Greece. On 20 April 1928, she was renamed Amazone II to release the name for a new submarine, Amazone. Amazone II was struck from the Naval Register in July 1932.

References

Citations 

 

World War I submarines of France
Armide-class submarines
1916 ships